is a 2006 Japanese anime television series created by Hiroto Ishikawa and directed by Kiyoshi Fukumoto. The series is animated by Studio Comet, with the series written by Takashi Yamada, who later worked on HeartCatch PreCure! and character designs both done by Shuichi Seki and Shida Tadashi. The series first premiered on TV Aichi and TV Tokyo from January 7 to December 30, 2006 with a total of 51 episodes. The first episode preview was shown after the final episode of Transformers: Galaxy Force.

Plot summary
The Inuyama Family, along with their pet dog Tetsunoshin moves to the famous Hoppongi Hills (modeled after Roppongi Hills) from Kyushu. Rumi Inuyama's father owns an IT Company in Japan and is a step further to becoming number one. However, Tetsunoshin learned that his master's family loaned a lot of money renting their home in Hoppongi Hills, almost to the point of the whole company becoming Bankrupt. To make things even worse, the whole family spends a lot of money on everything, making Tetsunoshin's problems worse. To solve this problem, Tetsunoshin teamed up with the Hills Dogs and will do anything to pay all the Inuyama Family's expenses.

Characters

Hills Dogs/Dog Paradise Members
 

Tetsunoshin is a seven-month-old Toy Poodle living with the Inuyama Family. His owner is Rumi Inuyama. He and his owner were once from Kyushu before moving to the Hoppongi Hills in Tokyo. He speaks with a Kyushu accent and loves his owner and very much, and will do anything to get them out of bankruptcy. Tetsunoshin has a very long 5 meter pedigree certificate scroll, containing his family lineage (though its contents were washed off in Episode 25) and he is the 81st of the 102 born poodles. He also has a crush on Chocolat and likes her a lot. With Seto's powers, he can assume his human form as Celebrity Knight. As Celebrity Knight, he supports his master in many ways and tries to make her happy, though this transformation lasts for only three minutes.

Seto is a Miniature Schnauzer and the oldest member of the Hills Dogs. Usually trained well in magic, he stands as Tetsunoshin's mentor in any situation they face. As the leader of the Hills Dogs, he has responsibility on protecting their secret hideout, the Dog's Paradise from outsiders and will punish them if they revealed their secrets. Also he has an ability to turn dogs into humans, only for a short period of time.

Pochi is a Bull terrier and also one of Tetsunoshin's close friends. His owner is Sagiyama Aya, a famous star in Tokyo. He first met Tetsunoshin after he saved him from John. After then he starts to adore Tetsunoshin and helps him with his owner's family problems. He is very shy and sometimes can't handle spicy foods, but he also has courage to take some risks. He was once transformed into a human by Seto.

Hakase is a 5-year-old Welsh Corgi and the genius of the Hills Dogs. He has an IQ level of 200.5 and is a genius on inventing things. Hakase usually serves as a trader to earns funds for the whole Dog Paradise and sometimes spends some of his time in Akihabara looking for electronics. He also produces a lot of strange inventions and gadgets that benefit the members of the Hills Dogs.

Hanzou is a 7-year-old Mameshiba and also a trained Iga-ryū ninja, usually self trained. He speeches ends with "~de gozaru" and is very calm and yet also very supportive to the members of the Dog Paradise. He first met Seto years ago as a stray in an early age and he was taken in as a member of the group. Hanzo is also one of the Hills Dogs who is transformed into a human.

Meg is a 2-year-old Papillon and also one of the three female members of the Hills Dogs. Being one of the youngest members, Meg is a sassy girl and likes to be an idol someday, going through auditions. She has a huge rivalry with Audrey, one of the Shirogane Dogs and will try everything to be on top and become a star. Meg also serves as Seto's massager, usually in her dog form, she uses her feet to massage Seto's back. Like the others, she has a human form as well.

Victoria is a 5-year-old Poodle and also one of the three female members of the Hills Dogs. She is very stylish and yet mature, and also serves as Seto's Secretary. She has a lot of experience on TV commercials and also a good VIP while in human form. Victoria also wears glasses and has allergies to Elephants since she was a puppy. She is also afraid of ghosts.

Rinia is a 6-year-old English Setter and also a speedster of the Hills Dogs. He operates the vehicles Hakase makes for his friends and also an expert pilot.

Iwan is a 10-year-old Siberian Husky and the group's strongman. He was born as a mercenary dog and was trained since he was a puppy. Thought sometimes dimwitted and goes into action rather than words, he doesn't like to be called an idiot by his friends. He also has a human form thanks to Seto's Dog Magic.

Ooana is a 10-year-old Pekingese and also the group's gambler. Although he is an expert gambler, he sometimes has his share of bad-luck and sometimes his sense of direction is bad.

 

Chocolat is a Chihuahua and also one of the three female members of the Hills Dogs. Her owner is Yuki Yagino. She recently joined the group after Tetsunoshin told her about the Dog Paradise. She is the object of Tetsunoshin's affection, having fallen in love with her at first sight and sometimes calling her an angel. Thought she can get mad when he said something bad to her. At first glance, Chocolat seems innocuous, but in reality, she is a spy from the Shirogane Dogs named Twelve, to spy on the Hills Dogs, especially to Seto. She once worked in a Circus before joining the Shiroganes, later being adopted by Yuki's family. She was killed in episode 50.

John is a Dachshund He's a crazy and yet country dog calling from Shirogan. He once worked for the formerly henchman of Shirogan, but defected after Tetsunoshin saved his life.

Shirogane Dogs

The leader of the Shirogane Dogs. He is cruel and tyrannical and would like nothing less than to see the Hills Dogs put down. He used to a pupil at the same training grounds as Seto. Like Seto he can also make use of magic.

The Shirogane ninja. He took the same training as Hanzou.

Other Dogs

Humans

Tetsunoshin's owner. She is very charismatic, making friends with new people and doing her part for her family. She attends the Saint Lady Academy.

Rumi's father. He is the head of his IT company, but often finds himself stressed from large amounts of debts and his relatives squandering his hard-earned money. Still he is very supportive of his family and Tetsunoshin.

Rumi's mother. She is very carefree and not very cautious of the family's budget, that she often goes into shopping sprees. Sometimes she offers encouragement and confidence to her husband.

The Inuyama's serving maid. She is very klutzy, often breaking something or hurting herself. She sometimes serves as Rumi's mentor.

Rumi's rival, who turns her face at the Inuyama family's methods and possessions with some ridicule and portraying a standoffish attitude. She also competes for Celebrity Knight's affection. 

A skilled dog trimmer, who becomes infatuated with Tetsunoshin (much to the dog's chagrin) and has a passion for cross-dressing.

An Indian prince who travels on an elephant, even indoors. He does not share the monarchic traditions of his father and tries enjoy his new life in the Hills.

Theme songs
Opening theme
and yet
Lyrics: Yuya Abe
Composition: Yuya Abe
Arrangement: Yoshiyuki Sahashi & Suther Rand
Artist: Suther Rand (Epic Records)

Lyrics: Naru Kawamoto
Composition: UZA
Arrangement: Hiroaki Ono
Artist: Naru Kawamoto (T.Y.Entertainment)

Ending theme
Life Gauge
Lyrics: hiroko and mitsuyuki miyake
Composition: mitsuyuki miyake
Artist: mihimaru GT (Universal Music Japan)
WISH
Lyrics: Nana Inoue
Composition: UZA
Arrangement: Hiroaki Ono
Artist: Nana Inoue (T.Y.Entertainment)

Episodes

External links
 TV Aichi's Tetsunoshin website
 

Anime with original screenplays
Animated television series about dogs
Espionage in anime and manga
Television series about shapeshifting
Takara Tomy